Steven M. Awodey (born 1959) is an American mathematician and logician. He is a Professor of Philosophy and Mathematics at Carnegie Mellon University.

Biography
Awodey studied mathematics and philosophy at the University of Marburg and the University of Chicago. He earned his Ph.D. from Chicago under Saunders Mac Lane in 1997. He is an active researcher in the areas of category theory and logic, and has also written on the philosophy of mathematics. He is one of the originators of the field of homotopy type theory. He was a member of the School of Mathematics at the Institute for Advanced Study in 2012–13.

Bibliography

References

External links
 
 
 
 
 

American logicians
20th-century American mathematicians
21st-century American mathematicians
Philosophers of mathematics
Living people
University of Marburg alumni
University of Chicago alumni
Institute for Advanced Study visiting scholars
Carnegie Mellon University faculty
1959 births